Deniz Işın (born 28 May 1992) is a Turkish actress and screenwriter.

Life and career 
Deniz Işın was born on 28 May 1992 in İzmir. She graduated with a bachelor's degree in chemical engineering from Ege University and got her master's degree in materials science and engineering from the same university. 

She then took acting lessons for two years at Sahnetozu Theatre in İzmir and later spent a year studying acting in Istanbul. In 2017, she took part in an adaptation of Lysistrata, and in the following year she portrayed Alice in You Can't Take It with You. After appearing in a number of TV commercials, Işın made her television debut with FOX's Her Yerde Sen. She then had a supporting role on İyi Günde Kötü Günde before rising to prominence with her role as Sahra in Sefirin Kızı. Additionally, Işın was featured in the music video for Murat Boz's song "Gece". She became well known with her portrayal of the character İrem in the TV series Masumiyet.

She was chosen for the iconic role "Leyla" in hit surreal comedy series Leyla ile Mecnun, which came back on screens after 8 years. With Sarp Bozkurt, she wrote and played in short comedy series Eee Sonra/Bizden Olur Mu which was published on YouTube and later Blutv. She also appeared in the short film Ölüler İçin Yaşam Kılavuzu, which premiered in Cannes Film Festival. She had leading roles in action film Anka and comedy film Aşk Çağırırsan Gelir. In 2022, she starred in the series Sevmek Zamanı.

Filmography

Music video

References

External links 
 
 

1992 births
Living people
Ege University alumni
Turkish film actresses
Turkish television actresses